Germany  competed at the 2017 World Games in Wroclaw, Poland, from July 20, 2017 to July 30, 2017.

Competitors

American Football
Germany has qualified at the 2017 World Games in the American Football Men Team event.

Fistball
Germany has qualified at the 2017 World Games in the Fistball Men Team event.

Gymnastic

Rhythmic Gymnastics
Germany has qualified at the 2017 World Games:

Women's individual event - 1 quota

Korfball
Germany has qualified at the 2017 World Games in the Korfball Mixed Team event.

Sport Climbing
Germany has qualified at the 2017 World Games:

Men's Bouldering - Jan Hojer
Women's Bouldering - Juliane Wurm

Tug of war 

Germany won the bronze medal in the men's outdoor 640 kg event.

References 

Nations at the 2017 World Games
2017 in German sport
2017